Industrial Evolution is a Big Finish Productions audio drama based on the long-running British science fiction television series Doctor Who.

Plot
In Lancashire, at the height of the Industrial Revolution, while some people are fighting against the machines, some of the machines are fighting the people.

Cast
The Doctor – Colin Baker
Evelyn Smythe – Maggie Stables
Thomas Brewster – John Pickard
Samuel Belfrage – Rory Kinnear
Stephen Gibson – Warren Brown
Clara Stretton – Joannah Tincey
Robert Stretton – Hugh Ross
George Townsend – Paul Chahidi
Humanoids – John Banks

External links
Industrial Evolution

2011 audio plays
Sixth Doctor audio plays